George Byng DL JP (17 May 1764 – 10 January 1847), of Wrotham Park in Middlesex (now Hertfordshire), and of Wentworth House, 5, St James's Square, London, was a British Whig politician.

Origins
He was the eldest son and heir  of George Byng (1735-1789) (eldest son of Robert Byng (1703-1740), third son of Admiral George Byng, 1st Viscount Torrington (1663-1733)) of Wrotham Park, by his wife Anne Conolly, a daughter of William Conolly (d.1754), of Stratton Hall, Staffordshire and of Castletown, co. Kildare, a Member of Parliament. Anne's mother was Lady Anne Wentworth, a daughter of Thomas Wentworth, 1st Earl of Strafford (1672–1739). His younger brother was Field Marshal John Byng, 1st Earl of Strafford (1772-1860), elevated to the peerage in 1847 with the same territorial designation as the earldom of his maternal cousins, which earldom had become extinct in 1799.

Career
He was educated at Göttingen University from 1780 where he studied under Georg Christoph Lichtenberg.
Byng was returned to Parliament for Middlesex in 1790, a seat he held until his death 57 years later. During his early years he was an associate of Charles James Fox. Between 1832 and 1847 he was Father of the House of Commons. He was offered a peerage in order to increase the Whig majority in the House of Lords prior to the 1832 Reform Act, but refused. He was also a Deputy Lieutenant and Justice of the Peace for Middlesex.

Marriage
In 1797 he married Harriet Montgomery, a daughter of Sir William Montgomerie, 1st Baronet, of Macbie Hill, Peebles, but had no children.

Death and succession
He died on 10 January 1847, aged 82. His heir was his younger brother, Field Marshal John Byng, 1st Earl of Strafford (1772-1860), elevated to the peerage in the same year.

References

External links 
 

1764 births
1847 deaths
Members of the Parliament of Great Britain for English constituencies
Members of the Parliament of the United Kingdom for English constituencies
UK MPs 1801–1802
UK MPs 1802–1806
UK MPs 1806–1807
UK MPs 1807–1812
UK MPs 1812–1818
UK MPs 1818–1820
UK MPs 1820–1826
UK MPs 1826–1830
UK MPs 1830–1831
UK MPs 1831–1832
UK MPs 1832–1835
UK MPs 1835–1837
UK MPs 1837–1841
UK MPs 1841–1847
Deputy Lieutenants of Middlesex
Whig (British political party) MPs for English constituencies
British MPs 1790–1796
British MPs 1796–1800